Butterworth–Kulim Expressway, BKE,   (Malay: Lebuhraya Butterworth–Kulim), is the only opened toll system's expressway in Penang, Malaysia. The  expressway connects Butterworth, Penang in the west to Lunas, Kedah in the east. It is also a main route to East–West Highway (Federal Route 4) via Baling, Kedah and Gerik, Perak.

Route background
The Butterworth–Kulim Expressway E15 is an east–west oriented expressway and concurrents with the Federal Route 4 and Asian Highway Route AH140 along its entire length. The actual starting point of the expressway is counted as Kilometre 5. Many maps have mistakenly labelled the section between Exit 1501 Kubang Sebang Interchange and Butterworth as a part of the E15 expressway; however, it is incorrect as the remaining 5-km section is not maintained by PLUS Malaysia Berhad but rather by Lingkaran Luar Butterworth (Penang) Sdn. Bhd.

The zeroth kilometre is located at Jalan Heng Choon Thian at Butterworth Outer Ring Road's Container Terminal Interchange.

History 
The construction of BKE started in December 1994 and was completed in September 1996.

KLBK Sdn Bhd
Konsortium Lebuhraya Butterworth-Kulim (KLBK) Sdn Bhd, commercially known as Buterworth Kulim Expressway (BKE), a wholly owned subsidiary of PLUS Expressway Berhad ("PLUS Expressways",) has been awarded the concession and contract to construct and operate the highway of dual two-lane carriageway with separate motorcycle tracks and related highway facilities for the 16.78 km highway. The concession period is for 32 years (June 1994 to June 2026, including two years construction period), after which the highway will be transferred to the Government. On 2011, the company was taken over to PLUS Malaysia Berhad and its subsidiary Projek Lebuhraya Usahasama Berhad.

Features 
Geographically, the terrain between KM 5.00 (start point) and KM 11.00 is rather flat, passing through paddy field areas. From KM 11.00 to KM 19.00, the terrain is slightly undulating, where cut and fill slopes are common features. The terrain is again flat from KM 19.00 to KM 21.78 (end point), mainly passing through the estates and developing residential areas. 
Geometrically, there are four grades separated interchanges and one at grade interchange along BKE. Moreover, there are nine reinforced concrete bridges (three of those are river bridges, i.e., Sungai Mengkuang, Sungai Kulim and Sungai Karangan, whereas the rest are bridges over local roads or railway track).
Tuanku Bainun Teachers Training Institute (Institut Perguruan Tuanku Bainun) (IPTB) 
High speed limit 90 km/h
Four-lane dual carriageway
SOS emergency phones
Dedicated motorcycle lane

Tolls
The Butterworth–Kulim Expressway using opened toll systems.

Electronic Toll Collections (ETC)
As part of an initiative to facilitate faster transaction at the Lunas and Kubang Semang Toll Plazas, all toll transactions at both toll plazas on the Butterworth–Kulim Expressway will be conducted electronically via PLUSMiles, Touch 'n Go cards or SmartTAGs starting 9 September 2015.

myRFID 
As of Dec'2018, the Kubang Semang Toll Plaza and the Lunas Toll Plaza has myRFID activated on the right lane sharing the same lane with SmartTAG lane. This allows users of myRFID owners to fully utilize these fast lane.

Toll rates

Lunas toll plaza

Kubang Semang toll plaza

Note: Toll charges can only be paid with the Touch 'n Go and PLUSMiles cards or SmartTAG. Cash payment is not accepted.

List of interchanges

The Butterworth–Kulim Expressway is a 4-lane dual-carriageway expressway with its speed limit for the entire section is 90 km/h except at Seberang Jaya–Kubang Semang Toll Plaza section and Lunas Toll Plaza–Sungai Seluang section where the speed limit is 60 km/h.

References

External links
PLUS Expressways Berhad 
Butterworth–Kulim Expressway

1996 establishments in Malaysia
Expressways in Malaysia
North–South Expressway (Malaysia)
Expressways and highways in Penang
Roads in Penang